Long stop can refer to:
In phonology, a type of stop consonant
In cricket, a largely obsolete fielding position behind the wicketkeeper